In linguistics, a triphone is a sequence of three consecutive  phonemes. Triphones are useful in models of natural language processing where they are used to establish the various contexts in which a phoneme can occur in a particular natural language.

See also

 Diphone

References

Natural language processing
Phonology